Julep Beauty, Inc. is a privately held Seattle, Washington based cosmetics company founded in 2007 by Jane Park, a former Starbucks and Boston Consulting Group executive. The company sells its products online, which includes the company's Julep Maven service, in retail and in its branded beauty parlors.

History
In 2007 Julep opened four nail parlors in the Seattle area that offered manicures, pedicures, facials, and waxing. CEO Jane Park spotted an opportunity to promote and sell nail care products.  While expanding the parlors as a "third place" for women was the initial business model, Park later used the parlors as a testing ground for new products.

Julep moved into  e-commerce in 2008. In 2013, Julep products were available through their Seattle parlors, retailers such as Sephora, and on TV though QVC. Also in 2013, Julep opened its first pop-up store in New York City. Julep reported it had tripled its e-commerce revenue in 2013.

In 2013, Julep received funding from venture capital firms Andreessen Horowitz, Maveron, Troy Carter, as well as Precedent Investments, backed by Will Smith and Jada Pinkett Smith, and Jay Z and Beyoncé’s Roc Nation. The following year, Altimeter Capital, Azure Capital Partners and Madrona Venture Group also invested in Julep. By April 2014, Julep had raised $56M in venture capital financing.

Julep currently employs around 200 people and plans on using funding to accelerate the introduction of new products and other operating activities. While Jane Park and Julep generally enjoy a favorable reception in most media articles (see reference section below), employee reviews on Glassdoor suggest there are problems with retaining staff, and speak to issues with management and an inability to use vacation time—including accounts of former employees not being reimbursed for earned vacation time upon leaving the company.

In 2014, Julep's subscription service came under fire when the company received an "F" rating from the Better Business Bureau. The BBB's David Quinlan said about the 173 total complaints made during that period, "It's an alarming amount. I mean, think about it, 113 people have complained about this company to us and not one of them has received a response back." The BBB notified Julep on Aug. 19, 2014 of the complaint pattern, but its website noted that the company has not responded to its request to “address the pattern.” Julep responded with a statement blaming the influx of complaints on a surge in business and shipping errors. As of January 2015, Julep still maintains an "F" rating from the Better Business Bureau.

In March 2015, Julep announced that they were laying off 8% of their staff. According to CEO Jane Park, seventeen employees were laid off as part of a decision that "align[s] with Julep’s greatest long-term opportunities and to best position the company for success and category leadership."

In December 2018, Julep's parent company, Glansaol, filed for bankruptcy. As a result, Julep announced plans to close their two retail locations, lay-off over 100 employees, and relocate to its parent company's New York office.

Products
Julep designs, produces and sells its own products, working with scientists and manufacturers that also work for larger brands. The company sells over 200 shades of nail polish, each of which is given a woman's name. It has also expanded its line into makeup and skin care products.

In 2014, Julep launched its Plié Wand, an ergonomic nail polishing brush that bends, pivots, and attaches to the top of nail polish caps. Demand for the wand was first tested through a $75,000 crowdfunding campaign.

The company promotes its products as free of fumes and toxins.

Julep Maven
Julep introduced its monthly subscription service, Julep Maven, in 2011. Subscribers or “Mavens” pay a monthly fee to receive custom boxes of nail polish and makeup. To complement Julep's crowdfunding campaigns, Mavens may also act as beta-testers in the company's Idea Lab, answering surveys and posting on social media, allowing Julep to see how their products in development are being received.

On February 15, 2019, Maven customers were notified of the end of the service via email without notice, eliminating all the customer rewards (Jules).

References

Personal care brands